Samuel Leslie Moore (born 7 September 1987) is a former English professional footballer who is currently manager of Faversham Town.

He made his league debut for Ipswich Town at the age of 19. He went on to play for both Brentford and Stevenage for short spells before signing for non-league side Dover Athletic with whom he remained for two seasons. Dover Athletic proved unable to offer Moore his demands for full-time football however, and he moved to Conference side AFC Wimbledon. At the end of AFC Wimbledon's first season in League Two, Moore was voted Player of the Year 2011–12 by "Dons" fans. His contract was not renewed at the end of the 2014–15 season, and he subsequently signed for League Two side Leyton Orient.

Playing career

Early years
Moore was born in Deal, Kent and was educated at nearby Dover College. He joined the Charlton Athletic Academy at the age of 8, before being sold to the Chelsea Academy at the age of 14 on 1 July 2002 for a fee of £35,200. He remained with Chelsea for two years before joining the academy of Championship side Ipswich Town on a free transfer on 1 July 2004. The young midfielder quickly integrated himself into the Ipswich Town under–18s squad, and would receive his biggest honour for the club by being a member of the team that won the 2004–05 FA Youth Cup by beating Southampton 3–2 on aggregate on 23 April 2005 in front of a crowd of 14,889 at Portman Road. He signed his first professional contract with Ipswich Town on 1 July 2006, which would keep him at the club for two seasons. The young midfielder made his Football League debut for the club in a 3–1 win over Sunderland on 23 September 2006 as an 89th minute substitute for Matt Richards, in what would prove to be his only senior appearance for "The Blues".

On 25 July 2007, it was announced that Moore would join League Two side Brentford on an initial one-month loan deal. On 11 August 2007, Moore made his debut for Brentford in a 1–1 draw with Mansfield Town. On 15 August 2007, it was announced that Brentford manager Terry Butcher had extended Moore's loan spell with "The Bees" until 7 January 2008. Moore scored his first Football League goal for Brentford on 22 September 2007 in a 2–0 win over Chester City. Moore also scored the winning goal in a 1–0 victory over Lincoln City on 27 October 2007. Moore made his 20th and last appearance for "The Bees" on 5 January 2008 in a 1–0 win over Shrewsbury Town. After returning to Ipswich Town, Moore was released by manager Jim Magilton on 24 January 2008 after being told that he had no future with the club.

Stevenage Borough
On 28 January 2008, Moore signed for Conference side Stevenage Borough on a non-contractual basis until the end of the 2007–08 season. The 20-year-old midfielder made his debut for "The Boro" on 2 February 2008 in a 4–0 defeat by Exeter City. Moore scored his only goal for Stevenage in a 2–1 defeat by Northwich Victoria on 22 April 2008. Moore made his final appearance for "The Boro" in a 2–1 win over Halifax Town on 26 April 2008. Moore was not offered a new deal with Stevenage and was subsequently released by the club on 20 May 2008.

Dover Athletic
On 5 June 2008, the 20-year-old midfielder signed a two-year contract with his local club, Dover Athletic, who had just won promotion to the Isthmian League Premier Division. He remained with the club for two years but following his demands for full-time football, which could not be met by Dover, Moore left at the close of the 2009–10 season.

AFC Wimbledon
On 16 July 2010, Moore signed for Conference side AFC Wimbledon following strong performances as a trialist. On 21 August 2010, Moore opened his scoring account for The Dons with a goal in a 3–0 victory over Tamworth. On 18 November 2010, Moore scored a goal late in injury time against Ebbsfleet United to advance AFC Wimbledon to the second round of the 2010–11 FA Cup. On 5 May 2012, Moore was named AFC Wimbledon Player of the Year for the 2011–12 season. He made his 100th league appearance for the club, with only 5 of them being from the substitutes bench, in a 2–0 win over York City at Bootham Crescent on 7 September 2013.

Leyton Orient
On 9 June 2015, Moore signed for League Two side Leyton Orient on a two-year contract.

On 17 August 2016, Moore signed for Dover Athletic on a six-month loan until 14 Jan 2017.

Folkestone Invicta

On 5 October 2020 Moore signed for Isthmian League side Folkestone Invicta after he retired from playing for 2 years.

Managerial career 
On 22 May 2017, Moore was announced as first team manager of Isthmian Premier Division club Leatherhead, following the resignation of Jimmy Bullard. Moore also signed for the club as a player.

On 2 May 2018, Moore was appointed as first-team manager of National League South side Concord Rangers on a two-year contract, following an impressive debut season at Leatherhead. Likewise with his spell at Leatherhead, Moore will continue as a player/manager. In his debut season in the National League South, Moore guided Concord to a 6th-place finish, but due to the club failing to meet ground size requirements, they were in turn, barred from the play-offs. Four days later, it was announced that Moore had stepped down from his role due to "ongoing personal problems".

In May 2019, Moore was appointed manager of National League South club Hemel Hempstead Town. On 20 May 2020, Moore and his coaching staff parted company with Hemel Hempstead Town following a year at the club.

On 29 January 2022, he was named as manager of Isthmian League Premier Division side Potters Bar Town, with Moore handed the task of steering the club away from the relegation zone. Moore led the club up the table and on 9 April 2022 signed a contract with the club until 2024. On 29 November 2022, Moore left the club with them sitting top of the league after eighteen matches.

The same day as his departure from Potters Bar Town was announced, Moore was confirmed as the new manager of Faversham Town with his new club sat at the bottom of the Isthmian League South East Division.

Career statistics

Club

Managerial statistics

Honours
Ipswich Town
FA Youth Cup: 2004–05

Dover Athletic
Isthmian League Premier Division: 2008–09

AFC Wimbledon
Conference National play-offs: 2010–11

References

External links

1987 births
Living people
People from Deal, Kent
Footballers from Kent
English footballers
English football managers
Association football midfielders
Ipswich Town F.C. players
Brentford F.C. players
Stevenage F.C. players
Dover Athletic F.C. players
AFC Wimbledon players
Leyton Orient F.C. players
Leatherhead F.C. players
Concord Rangers F.C. players
Folkestone Invicta F.C. players
English Football League players
National League (English football) players
Isthmian League players
Leatherhead F.C. managers
Concord Rangers F.C. managers
Hemel Hempstead Town F.C. managers
Faversham Town F.C. managers
National League (English football) managers
Isthmian League managers